Mustang High School, often shortened to MHS, is a public school located in Mustang, Oklahoma, United States. It is the only secondary school of the Mustang Public Schools public school district and serves well over 3,000 students.

The complex contains a large band room, an auditorium, a performing arts center, and three gymnasiums. The school has received a Great Schools rating of 10 out of 10.

Sports 
Mustang offers baseball, softball, boys' basketball, girls' basketball, cheer, boys' cross country, girls' cross country, football, boys' golf, girls' golf, pom, boys' soccer, girls' soccer, swimming, boys' tennis, girls' tennis, boys' track, girls' track, volleyball, and wrestling.

Runner Gabe Simonsen broke the state record for Oklahoma in the two-mile run with a time of 8:56.07 in 2021

The school has a nationally competitive marching-band program formerly known as the Nightriders. Due to controversy in 2020, the band was renamed, now the Mustang Marching Band. They placed 17th nationally in 2021 with their show titled "Shark World."

Mustang is a 6A school.

Notable alumni 
 Dennis Byrd - former NFL defensive lineman
 Kendall Cross - Olympic freestyle wrestler, gold medalist at 1996 Summer Olympics
 Josh Cooper - former NFL wide receiver
 Shane Hamman - Olympic weightlifter
 Josh Heskew former Nebraska Cornhuskers football, National Champion also played for Oklahoma Wranglers.

References

External links
 Official website
 Athletics website

Schools in Canadian County, Oklahoma
Educational institutions in the United States with year of establishment missing
Public high schools in Oklahoma